Frood may refer to:

People
 Elizabeth Frood, New Zealand Egyptologist and academic
 Geoff Frood (1906–1995), Australian rules footballer
 Herbert Frood (1864–1931), English inventor, industrialist and entrepreneur
 Oren Frood (1889–1943), Canadian ice hockey player
 Frood Fouladvand, Iranian monarchist who disappeared in 2007

Other uses
 Frood Mine, Greater Sudbury, Ontario, Canada

See also
 Froot (disambiguation)
 Froude (disambiguation)